Peter Geel (24 November 1929 – 23 November 2017) was a Dutch footballer. He played in one match for the Netherlands national football team in 1955.

Geel died on 23 November 2017, at the age of 87.

References

External links
 

1929 births
2017 deaths
Dutch footballers
Netherlands international footballers
Association footballers not categorized by position